The enzyme levan fructotransferase (DFA-IV-forming) catalyzes the following process:

Produces di-β-D-fructofuranose 2,6′:2′,6-dianhydride (DFA IV) by successively eliminating the diminishing (2→6)-β-D-fructan (levan) chain from the terminal D-fructosyl-D-fructosyl disaccharide

This enzyme belongs to the family of lyases, specifically those carbon-oxygen lyases acting on polysaccharides.  The systematic name of this enzyme class is 2→6-β-D-fructan lyase (di-β-D-fructofuranose-2,6′:2′,6-dianhydride-forming). 

Other names in common use include 2,6-β-D-fructan D-fructosyl-D-fructosyltransferase (forming, di-β-Dfructofuranose 2,6′:2′,6-dianhydride), and levan fructotransferase.

References

 
 
 

EC 4.2.2
Enzymes of unknown structure